The Garden is an American experimental rock band from Orange County, California, formed in 2011 by twin brothers Wyatt and Fletcher Shears. The duo released their debut album The Life and Times of a Paperclip in 2013, with several smaller releases following. In 2015, the group released their second studio album Haha along with the lead single "All Smiles Over Here :)" to critical acclaim after being signed to Epitaph Records. They released their third album Mirror Might Steal Your Charm in March 2018, and their fourth album, Kiss My Super Bowl Ring was released in March 2020. The group’s fifth album, Horseshit on Route 66, was their second self-released album, being released in September 2022. The brothers have toured across the US, Europe, United Kingdom, China, Japan, New Zealand, Australia, Canada, Mexico, and in 2019, they appeared at Coachella.

History

2011–2014: Formation and debut album 
Twins Wyatt and Fletcher Shears formed The Garden in 2011 aged 17 as a side project of their band M.H.V (Ms. Hannah's Victims), but eventually they departed in order to pursue The Garden full time. Their name The Garden is intended as a metaphor for their music "growing" and evolving. They began playing shows and soon, still signed to their previous band's label Burger Records, released their debut self titled EP in May, 2012 on cassette, followed by Everything Is Perfect in December. They released the song "I'm a Woman" with a video in late 2012 before releasing their debut album The Life and Times of a Paperclip in July, 2013. A month later they released the Rules EP, featuring "Spirit Chant" previously released on Everything Is Perfect, and "Get Me My Blade" which was released along with a video earlier that year. They released a few more singles and EP's throughout 2014, as well as a song titled Cloak, a track featured on their then upcoming second album.

2015–2017: haha and U Want the Scoop? 
In January 2015, The Garden twins released a 7" titled "Surprise" featuring the B-side "This Could Build Us a Home". They signed to Epitaph Records and in August 2015, they announced their second studio album haha and premiered the lead single, "All Smiles Over Here :)". They released a video for the song "Egg" on October 9, a day before the duo embarked on a world tour. In 2016, they released a string of singles, "Play Your Cards Right" (featuring Crazy 8), "Call This # Now" and "California Here We Go", before releasing the U Want the Scoop? EP in March 2017, following a video for "All Access". During September 2017, the duo opened for Mac DeMarco on his North American tour.

2018: Mirror Might Steal Your Charm 
On January 24, 2018, The Garden released the single "No Destination" on Epitaph Records with an accompanying music video.
On February 27, they released a new music video for the single "Stallion," and announced their new album, Mirror Might Steal Your Charm, was set to release on March 30. A third single, "Call The Dogs Out," came out three days before the album's release on March 27.
They also played songs from the album at the ARTE concert in 2018.

2020: Kiss My Super Bowl Ring 
The band announced the release date of their fourth studio album, Kiss My Super Bowl Ring, on January 16, 2020. The announcement was supported by the album's first single, "Clench to Stay Awake." The album was released on March 13, 2020, and features production from 100 Gecs member Dylan Brady and Kero Kero Bonito bassist James Bulled under his side project Wharfwhit.

On July 21, 2020, The Garden announced that they would be "cutting all ties with Burger Records forever," following numerous accusations of sexual misconduct allegedly carried out by various artists on the Burger label. The Garden stated that they would "not stand with anyone, any band, or any label that enables this disgusting behavior."

2022: Horseshit on Route 66 
The singles "Freight Yard", "Orange County Punk Rock Legend", and "Chainsaw the Door" were released ahead of their fifth studio album, Horseshit on Route 66, which was released on September 8, 2022.

Side projects 
Both twins have experimental side projects: Wyatt's being Enjoy and Fletcher's being Puzzle. They’re also models, having campaigned for brands such as Yves Saint Laurent, Hugo Boss, Ugg, and Balenciaga.

Enjoy albums
 Gold (2012)
 Spaceships & Attitudes (2013)
 Quest (2013)
 Legacy (2014)
 Punk Planet (2015)
 Another Word for Joy (2016)
 Real Life Like Cold Ice (2016)
 Small Car Big Wheels (2018)
 Sessions With a Nasty Old Tree (2020)
 Boom, Bang, Blast (2013)

Puzzle albums
 That's Fine (2013)
 Pure (2013)
 It's Really Whatever (2013)
 I'll Just Say This (2013)
 Wonderful? (2013)
 Drinking Blood (2014)
 And Then Suddenly, Like Magic! (2014)
 Silver Jungle (2014)
 Soaring (2016)
 Laying in the Sand (2017)
 Tighten the Reins (2017)
 X Hail (2019)
 Places We Choose Not To Look (2020)
 The Rotten Opera (2023)

Musical style 
The band is known for their fast, punk-influenced two-piece bass and drum songs. At some point Wyatt has stated he switched from bass to guitar, but most people didn't notice because of his playing style and use of low notes. Their later music contains synth in addition to or instead of the guitar and drums. Both their music and image is characterized by "DIY principles, thrift store-cum-glam fashion style and a vast list of influences." The brothers classify their sound as "vada vada," a philosophy which Wyatt Shears describes as "an idea that represents pure creative expression, that disregards all previously made genres and ideals". The twins have described their influences from such diverse artists as: video game composer Manabu Namiki, rappers E-40 and Mykki Blanco, country singer Johnny Paycheck and punk rock bands Minutemen and Big Boys.

Discography 
Studio albums
 The Life and Times of a Paperclip (2013)
 haha (2015)
 Mirror Might Steal Your Charm (2018)
 Kiss My Super Bowl Ring (2020)
 Horseshit on Route 66 (2022)

EPs
 Burger Records Tape (2012)
 Everything Is Perfect (2012)
 Rules (2013)
 U Want the Scoop? (2017)

References

2011 establishments in California
Musical groups established in 2011
Punk rock groups from California
American twins
Twin musical duos